General's Lady is a 2020 Chinese television series that based on the novel with the same title by Yanbo Jiangnan. It stars Tang Min and Caesar Wu in the title role along with Lu Jia, Liu Yinjun and Cao Junxiang. It firstly aired in Youku on 9 October 2021 every Wednesdays until Saturdays. This series also aired in Taiwan.

This series started filming in October 2019 and finished in January 2020.

Plot
This series is tell about the love story between a playful and lively girl, Shen Jin (played by Tang Min) and a "Demon General" Chu Xiuming (played by Caesar Wu).

Shen Jin grew up in luxury as a member of the royal family. After the emperor decrees an arranged marriage, she is married off to the Earl of Yongning (also known as the "demon general") who defends the borders. Although she falls in love with her husband, Chu Xiu Ming, at first sight, she finds it difficult to blend in. Shen Jin gradually sheds her spoiled and entitled attitude and becomes a force to be reckoned with. With her unconventional methods, she solves many of the army's problems and comes to earn their trust and respect. However, there has been a shakeup in the imperial courts and the Chu army becomes a target. Shen Jin's parents are held hostage against their will while Shen Jin receives orders to act as a spy for the emperor. Can the married couple weather the storms to find happiness and peace?

Cast

Main
Tang Min as Shen Jin, the Countess of Yongning
The third daughter of the Rui Mansion. A smart and clever girl who looks dignified and elegant in front of the public, but in fact, she is lively, playful and likes to be informal. Although she came from a noble family, she was never treated well in the mansion due to her being a concubine's daughter. Since child, she was often locked by her second elder sister which made her very good at picking locks. She often dresses like a man in order to explore the city. She has a good relationship with her eldest sister Shen Shu (played by Xin Zi) who often protects her. In order to help her mother have a better life, Shen Jin chooses to marry the "Demon General", Chu Xiuming, whose previous three wives mysteriously died. The pendant that was given to her by her mother attracts Chu Xiuming's attention. Even if both of them liked playing tricks on each other, they fall in love and eventually have a child.
Titles: 
Shen Jin, the 3rd miss of Prince Rui's mansion
Countess of Yongning
Caesar Wu as Chu Xiuming, the Earl of Yongning
Zhu Bailin as young Chu Xiuming
He is a brave man, good at fighting and has excellent martial arts strength. His three former wives were rumored to be killed because of adultery, but were in fact spies sent by his enemies. Later, he marries Shen Jin after being decreed by the emperor. Although he is suspicious of Shen Jin at first, slowly she becomes his confidant and friend and he falls in love with her after dispelling his suspicions. He wants to find out the truth about the eighth prince and his aunt's death.
Titles:
The Devil General Chu Xiuming
Earl of Yongning

Supporting

People in the Earl of Yongning's mansion
Lu Jia as Rou Rou 
Shen Jin's maid who has a crush on Xiao Su. Later, she marries him and has his child.
Liu Yinjun as Xiao Su, the Commander of Jinweijun
Shen Jin's childhood sweetheart, who fell in love with Rou Rou and married her. 
Cao Junxiang as Chu Xiuyan/Shen An
Zhang Zihan as young Chu Xiuyuan/Shen An
His real name is Shen An but he changes his name to Chu Xiuyuan after becoming Chu Xiuming's brother in-name. As Shen An, he is a tough lieutenant in the barracks and as Chu Xiuyuan, he is an amiable man. He is the son of the former eighth prince but when his father dies after their mansion catches fire, he is rescued by the emperor and brought back incognito to the Chu Family who raised him in secret. His relationship with Chu Xiuming is very good and therefore he is always respected his sister in-law, Shen Jin. He was also once rescued by Ruo Nan when he was young and therefore is very grateful to her. Later, he becomes the emperor.
Titles:
Shen An, the Vice General of Chu family's army
Supervising City Officer
Emperor
Ge Shimin as Ruo Nan, the owner of Ruonan Cloth Shop
Peng Yulin as young Ruo Nan
Shen Jin, Rong Rong, and Xiao Su's childhood playmate. She is a good-hearted woman with a strong sense of responsibility and always takes care of people around her. As a young girl, Ruo Nan had a fight with Shen Jin. Chu Xiuyuan recognizes her as his savior and makes her become his empress not long after his ascension to the throne. As a mother of the country, she is deeply loved and respected by her people.
Titles:
Ruo Nan, the owner of Ruonan Cloth Shop
Escort Officer
Empress Consort
Xu Yiwen as Qing Qiu, the Chief of Yongning Mansion
All of her juniors and servants in the mansion commonly call her Aunt Qing Qiu.
Yang Wanli as Bao Zi Tou
Chu Xiuming's servant who is in love with Xiao Cong; the two later become a couple.
You Cong as Xiao Cong
One of the Yongning Mansion's maids. Both Chu Xiuyuan and Pao Zitou call her as Lady Xiao Cong. She secretly likes the lieutenant Chu Xiuyuan, so she often makes clothes and food for him. However, Chu Xiuyuan does not know her true feelings for him, which makes her feel disappointed. In the end, she becomes Pao Zitou's wife and lives together with him.
Jiang Haoyang as Yuan'er
One of Yongning Mansion's servants. Because Princess Yingzu gets drunk with Shen Jin in the mansion, he takes care of the princess all night. After getting together, the princess asks him to ask her father for her hand in marriage. After he agrees, Yuan'er leaves the Yongning Palace and lives together with the princess; he becomes Prince Consort Yingzu.
Lin Luyao as Ma Ya, Princess Yingzu
Yuan'er's lover; she later marries him.
Jin Le as the Ninth Princess, Princess Dangchao
She is the daughter of the Emperor and Consort Chen who likes her guard Su Chen. She admires Shen Jin and Chu Xiuming's feelings so she becomes good friends with Shen Jin.
Xu Hao as Su Chen, a palace guard in love with Princess Dangchao.

Imperial Family
Xin Zi as Shen Shu
The oldest daughter of the Rui family. She is close with Shen Jin, her younger half sister. Although she marries a nobleman, her husband never likes her and ends up having a child with his concubine. She also has a miscarriage, which puts her in a precarious position in her husband's family. After getting pregnant again, Shen Shu gives birth to a child as she hoped for.
Ke Naiyu as Shen Zi
The second daughter of the Rui family and Consort Xu's daughter. Savage and willful, she always relies on her father's favor and often bullies Shen Jin. After being trained by Chu Xiuming, she begins to change and get along with Shen Jin; their sister relationship also becomes much closer. She later gets married.
Xiao Yu as Shen Jing
The fourth daughter of the Rui family who likes to bully Shen Jin with Shen Zi.  After changing and renewing her relationship with Shen Jin, they are able to get along with each other in harmony. She later gets married.
Gao Yi as Prince Rui
The emperor's brother and the father of Shen Shu, Shen Zi, Shen Jin, and Shen Jing.  He prefers his mistress, Bai Xiaoniang and Shen Zi over everyone in his family and often uses his primary wife as his shield. In the peoples' eyes, he is a foolish lord.
Dong Xiangyu as Consort Chen
Shen Jin's birth mother, also known as Lady Gaoming. A gentle and dignified woman but she is born into a lower-class family and has a humble background. She is not favored in the Rui mansion and often gets bullied by Consort Xu and her husband's other wives.
Wang Lan as Consort Xu, Shen Zi's mother.
Li Sha as Princess Rui
Shen Shu's mother and Prince Rui's primary wife. Her relationship with Consort Chen and Shen Jin is relatively good. Although she is a concubine at first, she is at a loss to face the contradictions in back house. When Consort Xu and Consort Chen have a conflict because they ask Shen Jin to get married, they are pushed by her husband to act as his shield. She is the eighth princess consort's good friend and keeps secretly giving news to the general while investigating the accident that year.
Mei Nisha as Consort Bai Xiaoniang, Prince Rui's favourite wife and Shen Zi's birth mother.
Zhang Yingchen as Emperor Cheng
The emperor becomes suspicious of Chu Xiuming after the traitorous officials' investigation, but in fact his heart is like a mirror. He desperately wants to break through the kingdom and unwilling to the throne. When the eighth prince's mansion caught fire many years ago, Chu Xiuyuan was rescued and his name was erased; he was also sent to the Chu Family Army and was raised to prevent him from being victimized by the traitorous officials. Later in episode 31, he surrenders the emperor's position to Chu Xiuyuan.
Liu Yonggang as Eighth Prince / Hua Daye
His real identity is the eighth prince and he reveals his identity and the truth in episode 28.
Geng Liming as Eighth Princess Consort, the Eighth Prince's wife and Queen of Rui's good friend.
Liu Yiran as Shen Jin and Chu Xiuming's son.

Extended cast
Zhu Yun'er as Yun Niang, Shen Shu's husband's concubine who is pregnant with his baby.
Liao Songmei as 7th Aunt
Jing Lu as 8th Aunt
Liu Yinjun as Xiao Xiao
Zhao Wenming as Master Situ
Wang Fangzheng as Wang Min
Li Yiqin as Da Rou
He Xingyu as Hu Te
Zheng Shengli as Liu Qi
Yue Chunyu as General Zuo
Xu Ke as Minister Chen
Xu Meng as Minister Liang
Chen Baoguo as Father Chu
Ren Wanjing as Mother Chu
Yuan Zhiying as A Bin
Shi Guling as Hu Zi
Zhao Zhiyan as Su Qiao
Min Jinfeng as Xiao Qing
Zheng Yuan as Xiao Bai
Gao Tian as Xiao Ying
Zhao Xingze as Commander Yun
Guo Jianwei as Physician Wang

Special appearances
Wang Kunlun as the Eagle Tribe Soldier
Zhao Yanda as the Head of Eagle Tribe
Han Liangliang as the Medicine Master of Eagle Tribe
Yang Chaowei as a Painter
Lu Huan as a Physician
Feng Liping as a Villager
Ge Xingjia as a Painter
Zhou Yan as a Eunuch
Yang Bin as Eunuch Da
Gu Baofeng as a Gardener
Wang Xinfang as a Physician
Feng Peng as the Elder

Soundtrack

Broadcast

References

External links
General's Lady on Viki .
General's Lady on IMDb .
General's Lady on Youku .
.

Chinese historical television series
2020 Chinese television series debuts
Chinese comedy television series
Chinese romantic comedy television series
Chinese romance television series
Youku original programming
2020 Chinese television series endings